Roshon Primus (born 14 August 1995) is a Barbadian cricketer. He made his first-class debut for Trinidad and Tobago in the 2016–17 Regional Four Day Competition on 11 November 2016. On debut he took match figures of 7 wickets for 68 runs, which included figures of 6 wickets for 30 runs in the first innings, giving Trinidad and Tobago a nine-wicket win.

He made his List A debut for Trinidad and Tobago in the 2016–17 Regional Super50 on 27 January 2017. He made his Twenty20 debut for Guyana Amazon Warriors in the 2017 Caribbean Premier League on 11 August 2017. In October 2019, he was selected to play for Barbados in the 2019–20 Regional Super50 tournament.

References

External links
 

1995 births
Living people
Barbadian cricketers
Barbados cricketers
Trinidad and Tobago cricketers
Guyana Amazon Warriors cricketers
Place of birth missing (living people)